The Immortal Guard of Imperial Iran, also known as Imperial Guard, was both the personal guard force of Mohammad Reza Pahlavi, the last Shah of Iran, and an elite combat branch of the Imperial Iranian Army. It was created in 1942 and disbanded in 1979 following the Iranian Revolution. It was named after the Immortals, an elite unit of 10,000 Persian soldiers in the army of the Achaemenid Empire.

Origins

In 1921 a Persian Royal Guard was in existence comprising 20,000 men. A Guard Division was raised in 1925 by Reza Shah, incorporating both cavalry and infantry units. The Imperial Guard was subsequently formed in 1942 from 700 volunteers. It was originally designed and organized by General Jafar Shafaghat. The division was modeled after the French Republican Guard and the British Household Cavalry and foot guards. In 1953 the unit was expanded in size to a division under General Teymur Bakhtiar. In 1972 the Lashkari Guard Division was incorporated in the Imperial Guard together with a Conscript Brigade, expanding the Guard to a full corps of two divisions.

Structure

Javidan Guard 
The core of the Imperial Guard was the all volunteer Javidan Guard (Gârd e Jâvidân, Persian: Immortal Guard), better known as the "Immortals" after the ancient Persian royal guard or Persian Immortals. The "Immortals" were based in the Lavizan Barracks in northern Tehran. By 1978 this elite force comprised a brigade of 4,000-5,000 men, including a battalion of Chieftain tanks. It was responsible for the internal and external security of the royal palaces. A special plain-clothes unit was called Ma'mourin Makhsous (Special Agents)

Prior to the 1967 Imperial Coronation a Pahlavi Cavalry Guard was formed, giving the Javidan Guard a Household Cavalry type mounted escort unit for ceremonial occasions. According to differing accounts this detachment was 30 to 50-strong.

The last Commanding Officer of the Javidan Guard was Lieutenant-Colonel Yusuf-i-nijad.

Main Imperial Guard
By the late 1970s the entire Imperial Guard (including conscripts outside the Javidan units) was 18,000 strong, with artillery, armored and helicopter units. The entire Guard comprised some 6% of the army, and were the only troops stationed permanently in the capital Tehran.

Recruitment
A recruit to the Imperial Guard had to pass a series of proficiency tests, varying in subjects and difficulty. Reportedly one of the prerequisites for initiation was to be able to recite one's family history back for 23 generations from memory alone.

Uniforms and insignia
Imperial Guard units were distinguished by salmon (light red) coloured insignia. The Pahlavi Cavalry Guard had special blue and red ceremonial uniforms, including silver cuirasses and crested helmets.

Iranian Revolution
The Imperial Guard remained loyal to Mohammad Reza Pahlavi until his departure for exile in January 1979. After two days of fighting from the 9th through 11 February, against armed civilians and dissident Air Force and Army personnel, the Imperial Guard was withdrawn to its bases. The Guard was disbanded on 17 February 1979. The Javidan Guard was formally dissolved by the new Iranian regime, although some portions of the wider Imperial Guard remained in existence. These remaining units were stripped of their historical privileges and duties and integrated into the 21st Division of the regular Army Ground Forces. They saw action in the Iran–Iraq War.

Commanders of the Imperial Guard
The last commander of the Imperial Guard at the time of the 1979 Iranian Revolution was Lieutenant General Ali Neshat. One of the former Guard commanders was General Gholam Ali Oveisi (1960–1965). One of the original commanders, General Jafar Shafaghat, during the last months prior to the fall of the monarchy in 1979 was appointed by the Shah as the minister of defense (the literal translation of this post from Persian is minister of war) under Shapour Bakhtiar Cabinet until the fall of the government.

Commanders of the unit were:
 Capt. Jafar Shafaghat and Capt. Bayandor (commanders of two rival companies with rotating responsibility)
 2nd Col. Iraj Mahvi (two companies unified and expanded to a brigade)
 Abbas Gharabaghi (a new "special guard" was created under his command)
 Amirgholi Zargham
 Col. Nematollah Nassiri (1951–65)
 Maj. Gen Abdolali Badrei (1974–79)
 Maj. Gen. Ali Neshat (1979)

See also
 History of Iran
 Military history of Iran

References

1942 establishments in Iran
1979 disestablishments in Iran
Organisations of the Iranian Revolution
Guard
Former guards regiments
Royal guards
Military units and formations disestablished in 1979